Great Lakes Gliding Club (GLGC) is a soaring club located at Tottenham/Ronan Aerodrome, 56.9 km northwest of Toronto, Ontario, Canada.

Great Lakes Gliding provided facilities and pilot training for construction and testing of the UTIAS Snowbird, the first human-powered ornithopter to sustain straight and level flight, now undergoing record certification by the Fédération Aéronautique Internationale (FAI).

GLGC operates on a not-for-profit basis, and flight instruction is provided for free by volunteer instructors.

References

External links
 Great Lakes Gliding Club

Organizations based in Ontario
Gliding in Canada
Gliderports in Canada